Jenny Lind is a 1932 American Pre-Code musical film directed by Arthur Robison and starring Grace Moore, André Luguet and André Berley. It is a French-language remake of the 1930 film A Lady's Morals, which also starred Moore but had a largely different cast and crew. Alternative language versions were common during the early years of sound until dubbing became more widespread.

The film portrays the career of the nineteenth century Swedish opera singer Jenny Lind.

Cast
 Grace Moore as Jenny Lind 
 André Luguet as Paul Brandt  
 André Berley as P.T. Barnum  
 Françoise Rosay as Rosatti  
 Mona Goya as Selma  
 Georges Mauloy as Garcia 
 Paul Porcasi as Maretti  
 Adrienne D'Ambricourt as Adèle  
 Giovanni Martino as Zerga

References

Bibliography
 Gevinson, Alan. Within Our Gates: Ethnicity in American Feature Films, 1911-1960. University of California Press, 1997.

External links
 

1932 films
1932 musical films
1930s French-language films
American musical films
Films directed by Arthur Robison
1930s biographical films
American biographical films
Biographical films about singers
Films set in the 19th century
Metro-Goldwyn-Mayer films
American black-and-white films
Cultural depictions of Jenny Lind
Cultural depictions of P. T. Barnum
Remakes of American films
1930s American films